Girl Alone was an American radio soap opera broadcast on NBC from 1935 to 1941. Sponsored by Kellogg's and Quaker Oats, the series was scripted by Fayette Krum.

Characters and story

After inheriting a fortune, Patricia Rogers (Betty Winkler) falls in love with the trustee of her estate, John Knight, portrayed by Karl Weber, Les Damon, Macdonald Carey, Bob Bailey and Syd Simons. Separating from Knight and leaving Chicago, Rogers enters into a romantic relationship with Phoenix newspaperman Scoop Curtis (Don Briggs, Pat Murphy, Arthur Jacobson), who is later paralyzed by an automobile accident.

Other characters and the actors who played them were as follows:

The announcers were Bob Brown and Charles Lyon.

The program's theme was "The Girl Alone Suite" by Don Marcotte.
Gordon Hughes and Axel Gruenberg directed.

References

1930s American radio programs
1940s American radio programs
American radio soap operas
NBC radio programs